Letter to America is a 2001 Bulgarian film directed by Iglika Trifonova. It was Bulgaria's submission to the 73rd Academy Awards for the Academy Award for Best Foreign Language Film, but was not accepted as a nominee.

See also

Cinema of Bulgaria
List of submissions to the 73rd Academy Awards for Best Foreign Language Film

References

External links

2001 films
2001 drama films
2000s Bulgarian-language films
Bulgarian drama films
2000s English-language films